Everett Crowley Park is a 38-hectare large forested park with trails, located within the Champlain Heights area of Vancouver. The park was previously a landfill, but was allowed to become reforested for recreational purposes. Currently, it is Vancouver's 5th largest public park. The surrounding neighborhood was the last area to be developed in Vancouver in the 1970s. The park is maintained, developed, and protected by the Vancouver Park Board and stewarded by a committee of the Champlain Heights Community Association, the Everett Crowley Park Committee (ECPC).  Many of the trails in the park are designated as dog off-leash areas. Everett Crowley Park is situated north of the Fraser River. It is a 3-minute walk north of Vancouver's developing River District, on the edge of the Fraser River.

History
Prior to being a park, the area was known to be the Kerr Street garbage dump. The Kerr Street garbage dump served as Vancouver's main landfill from 1944 to 1967. The dump was closed in 1966, and the deposited waste was up to 49 metres in places. Following 1967, the area was closed for 20 years until being re-introduced as Everett Crowley Park in 1987. Dedication and opening of the park was promoted through petitioning and lobbying by local residents. Eventually, the garbage dump was reforested by local and invasive species, although some efforts were made by the community. Since 2010, large areas of Himalayan Blackberry have been removed and replaced with several thousand trees planted by the Vancouver Park Board. The park is named after Everett Crowley, who was the owner of Avalon Dairy, Vancouver's last independent dairy. Everett Crowley served on Vancouver's Park Board as a Parks Commissioner from 1961 to 1966.

Everett Crowley 
Everett Crowley was born on June 3, 1909. He was the first owner of Avalon Dairy, Vancouver's last independent dairy. During 1961 to 1966, he served as the Parks Commissioner. Everett Crowley lived until the age of 75.

Ecology 

Everett Crowley Park is in transition. Since the early 1970s, native and invasive plants and animals have been slowly recolonizing the park, transforming it into a young forest of hardy deciduous trees, wildflowers, and opportunistic blackberry. The area is recovering, and the result is a botanically diverse landscape frequented by birds and other wildlife, who find refuge in this urban wilderness.

Before to usage as a garbage dump in 1944, the area was a heavy dense coniferous forest. Trees native to this area were mostly hemlock and cedar trees. In addition, salmon were present in a creek that ran through a ravine. After its closure as a landfill, local plants such as cottonwoods and maple trees began moving back into the area. Invasive species, such as blackberry shrubs, have taken residence in the park, and are a very common sight.

According to a bird expert, over 200 different species of birds have been spotted in the park. These include Stellars' Jays, Black-capped Chickadees, and the American Robin. The park is also a landing spot for migrant songbirds.

Everett Crowley Park Committee 
The Everett Crowley Park Committee (ECPC) leads community stewardship of the park. The committee consists of members local neighbors, dog walkers, ecologists, and bird enthusiasts. The Vancouver Board of Parks and Recreation is responsible for the operational maintenance of the park and leads large-scale restoration work, involving the ECPC wherever possible. The Board of Parks and Recreation eventually voted "That this Park Board re-commit itself to the maintenance and preservation of the naturalness of Everett Crowley Park and any steps to enhance its naturalness." The committee has five main goals: park maintenance, recreation, education through appreciation of nature, habitat rehabilitation, and to work within a larger ecological context.

Events

Earth Day
Earth Day Vancouver is hosted as an annual celebration in the City of Vancouver. Earth Day occurs on April 22, and is the "largest environmental event in the world". Citizens are encouraged to use more environmentally friendly means to travel to events, such as walking, biking, or taking public transit. Everett Crowley Park is the site of the city's longest-standing annual Earth Day celebration. Activities include tree planting, bird-watching, educational walks, and is supported by local businesses and the Park Board. Family fun activities have included visiting "Bunkie the Clown" and "Lindsey Long Legs".

Birding With Margo 
Tours for bird watching and walking through the park are held on the third Sunday of each month at 8:30 AM.

Attractions

Trails 

Everett Crowley is extremely popular for local dog owners who wish to have their dogs off leash.

There are several trails in the park, with the majority of trails tending to circle the perimeter of the park. There are also smaller trails that are unnamed that may be more favorable for people who wish for more of an adventure, or for those who want to explore the forest.

Notable trails and areas 
Snake Trail: follows the entrance, is about 2.02 km long.

Vista Way Trail: leads to viewpoint on the North Edge of the Fraser River.

Kincross Creek: formerly used to have salmon running through it.

Manfred's Meadow: a large open area, suitable for picnics.

Mount Everett: point with the highest elevation in the park.

Blue Orchard Mason Bee 
A pollinator garden and a mason bee condo have been installed to assist the Blue Orchard Mason Bee in Manfred's Meadow.

Challenges

Being inclusive
Visitors often jog, cycle, or power walk in the park with their dogs as companions, but there are also visitors who prefer not to interact with dogs. To avoid conflict, the Vancouver Park Board have recommended to promote the awareness of responsible dog-handling and support initiatives such as the Canine Good Neighbour program, which is a 12-step test for dogs and the dogs will be accepted as a member of Canine Good Neighbor program upon completion of the test, to ensure that everybody can enjoy the beauty of the resource. Dog bowls are often left on the side of the trails, filled with water.

Vandalism and garbage
Vandalism such as spray painting, destruction of signs, and setting of fires have been problems with little solutions.

Access

Walking 
The park can be easily accessed by heading 2 minutes south of East 49th Avenue. It is directly east of the Fraseview Golf Course. From the River District, Everett Crowley Park is a 2 minute walk northbound and will be on the right hand side.

Transit 
The park can easily be accessed via transit by taking the number 26 bus towards Joyce Station at the Rosemont Dr. stop, or the number 100 bus towards the Marine Dr. Station at the Kerr St stop.

Parking 
There is a small parking lot that holds about 15 cars located by the entrance of the park. Parking is also available on the east side of Kerr St.

Outdoor Learning Project 
CityStudio’s outdoor learning project is inspired by Rewilding Vancouver, the Park Board’s strategy to celebrate the special wild places in the city and to bring experiences of nature into everyday life. CityStudio is currently working to encourage and facilitate outdoor learning in Everett Crowley Park with our educational partners at the SFU Semester in Dialogue and BCIT School of Construction and the Environment. The project team is working with students and community organizations to design and build infrastructure that supports outdoor learning in Everett Crowley Park, and additional parks will be explored through future project work. The project is supported by the Vancouver Foundation and the Vancouver Park Board.

Phase 1 
Phase 1 of the project, titled Semester Outside in the City, consisted of students and faculty from the SFU Semester in Dialogue program. With a focus on creating Temporary Intervention Projects, which were featured in a short film and report.

Phase 2 
Phase 2 of the project consisted of students and faculty from the BCIT School of Construction and the Environment. BCIT Architectural Science students have designed a series of small installations based on the outcomes of Phase 1 to support outdoor learning in Everett Crowley Park. These 5 student projects have inspired the addition of an outdoor learning classroom in Manfred's Meadow that will be built in the park Summer 2016.

Phase 3 
Phase 3 of the project once again welcomed students from the SFU Semester in Dialogue program back to Everett Crowley Park. With the program title Semester Outside in the City ll, the cohort developed a series of 3-hour outdoor education based curricula for a specific stakeholder group of their choice. Of those created, Rewild Your Senses aims to foster a sense of belonging among nature as well as blossoming interest and curiosity among those who work 9:00 - 5:00 office hours.

See also
 Champlain Heights, community the park is in
 Killarney, Vancouver, area of Vancouver that includes the park, the park is also mentioned here

References

Parks in Vancouver